The Iroquois River is a  tributary of the Kankakee River in the Central Corn Belt Plains of northwestern Indiana and northeastern Illinois in the United States.  It was named for the Iroquois people. Via the Kankakee and Illinois rivers, it is part of the watershed of the Mississippi River.

Course
The Iroquois River rises in Jasper County, Indiana, and flows generally west-southwestwardly through Newton County, Indiana, and Iroquois County, Illinois, where it turns northward and flows into Kankakee County, Illinois.

Along its course the Iroquois passes the town of Rensselaer, Brook, and Kentland in Indiana and the towns of Iroquois, Watseka and Sugar Island in Illinois.

Variant names
According to the Geographic Names Information System, the Iroquois River, or portions thereof, has also been known as:
Borntrager Ditch
Burns Ditch
Irokois River
Iroquois Ditch
Pickamick River
Pickamink Lateral
Pickamink River
Pinkamink River
Swain Ditch
Thompson Ditch

La rivière des Iroquois
The name, La rivière des Iroquois was given to the riverway by the French, through the Annual of  René de la Salle.  It has been proposed that the river got it name from la Fourche des Iroquois or the Fork of the Iroquois, now Aroma Park.  The French phrase would be a reference to "the Irouquois' Fork" or a place where the French or the French allied tribes (Illini) had an experience with the Iroquois at this location.

The French explores had arrived in the Kankakee basin René-Robert Cavelier, Sieur de La Salle in 1679.  The Iroquois had been raiding across the Michigan Peninsula over the previous decade and began to move further west around the southern tip of Lac de Illinois or Lake Michigan.  In 1682 he built Fort St. Louis atop Starved Rock State Park on the Illinois River as a place of refuge from raiding Iroquois.  Thus, the history of the Beaver Wars as the Iroquois raids became known and the French name for the junction of the modern Iroquois River and the Kankakee River implies the movement of Iroquois raiding bands through this location and probably using the Iroquois River route as their way around the Great marsh of the Kankakee.

A legend among the Illinois tells of a time the Iroquois were surprised along the bank of this waterway and were driven away with great losses. (Charlevoix‘ Narrative Journal, 1721, vol. 2, p. 199.)  Colonel Guerdon Hubbard hears a similar story in the middle 19th Century.

Basin
The Iroquois river is fed by the Sugar, Mud, Fountain Spring, Prairie, Langham, Pike and Beaver creeks. The Iroquois river, from the Sugar Island around Iroquois County Rd 3300 N to mouth in Aroma Park, the river is shallow and rocky. It is bordered by silurian limestone.  South of the island the river is deep and slow moving, nearly to the state line.

The Iroquois begins in the low lands, north and west of Rensselaer, Indiana. It circles clockwise to the north and east, entering Rensselaer from the east. Here the river turns towards the north, reaching its junction with the Kankakee another .

Towns and cities
 Rensselaer, Indiana
 Brook, Indiana
 Kentland, Indiana
 Iroquois, Illinois
 Watseka, Illinois
 Sugar Island, Illinois

See also
 Kankakee River
 List of Illinois rivers
 List of Indiana rivers

Sources

Columbia Gazetteer of North America entry
DeLorme (2003).  Illinois Atlas & Gazetteer.  Yarmouth, Maine: DeLorme.  .
DeLorme (1998).  Indiana Atlas & Gazetteer.  Yarmouth, Maine: DeLorme.  .

Gallery

Rivers of Illinois
Rivers of Indiana
Rivers of Iroquois County, Illinois
Rivers of Jasper County, Indiana
Rivers of Kankakee County, Illinois
Rivers of Newton County, Indiana
Tributaries of the Illinois River